Ralph Lewis may refer to:

Ralph Lewis (basketball), (born 1963)
Ralph Lewis (actor), (1872–1937)
Ralph Maxwell Lewis, Imperator of Rosicrucian organisation Ancient Mystical Order Rosae Crucis (AMORC) from 1939 to 1987
Ralph Lewis (1928 - 2017), founding member of the band Sons of Ralph